Julian Lee Strawther (born April 18, 2002) is a Puerto Rican–American college basketball player for the Gonzaga Bulldogs of the West Coast Conference (WCC).

High school career
Strawther played basketball for Liberty High School in Henderson, Nevada. As a junior, he averaged 27.3 points and 8.8 rebounds per game. In his senior season, he averaged 31.5 points, 11.1 rebounds and 2.2 assists per game, earning Southeast League co-MVP honors. Strawther scored 51 points against Apollo High School at the HoopHall West Invitational, setting an event record. He left as his school's all-time leader in points and rebounds. A consensus four-star recruit, he committed to playing college basketball for Gonzaga over offers from Marquette, Florida and UNLV.

College career
As a freshman at Gonzaga, Strawther averaged 3.4 points per game, serving as the backup to Corey Kispert. His team reached the national championship game. On November 15, 2021, he scored 18 points in an 84–57 win over Alcorn State. As a sophomore, Strawther averaged 11.8 points and 5.4 rebounds per game. He declared for the 2022 NBA draft following the season before ultimately returning to Gonzaga.

On January 28, 2023, Strawther scored a career-high 40 points in an 82-67 victory over Portland.

National team career
Although a native of Las Vegas, Strawther represents Puerto Rico at the international level due to his mother's Puerto Rican ancestry. At the 2019 FIBA Under-19 World Cup, he averaged 22 points and 6.1 rebounds per game, helping his team finish in sixth place. He recorded 40 points, 10 rebounds and four assists in a loss to Russia in the fifth-place game.

Career statistics

College

|-
| style="text-align:left;"| 2020–21
| style="text-align:left;"| Gonzaga
| 25 || 0 || 7.4 || .517 || .321 || .696 || 1.2 || .0 || .2 || .0 || 3.4
|-
| style="text-align:left;"| 2021–22
| style="text-align:left;"| Gonzaga
| 32 || 31 || 26.8 || .498 || .365 || .705 || 5.4 || 1.0 || .5 || .2 || 11.8
|- class="sortbottom"
| style="text-align:center;" colspan="2"| Career
| 57 || 31 || 18.3 || .502 || .358 || .703 || 3.5 || .6 || .4 || .1 || 8.1

Personal life
When Strawther was nine years old when his mother, Lourdes, died from breast cancer. His older sister, Paris, played college basketball for UNLV. Strawther's paternal grandfather, Edward, was a lieutenant colonel who served in World War II, and formed the Las Vegas Sentinel, one of two African-American newspapers in Nevada.

References

External links
Gonzaga Bulldogs bio
USA Basketball bio

2002 births
Living people
American men's basketball players
Basketball players from Nevada
Gonzaga Bulldogs men's basketball players
Puerto Rican men's basketball players
Shooting guards
Sportspeople from Las Vegas